The 46th Writers Guild of America Awards honored the best television, and film writers of 1993. Winners were announced on 13 March 1994..

Winners & Nominees

Film 
Winners are listed first highlighted in boldface.

Television

Documentary

Special Awards

References

External links 

 WGA.org

1993
W
1993 in American cinema
1993 in American television
Writers Guild of America Awards